Cañadas de Obregón   is a town and municipality, in Jalisco in central-western Mexico. It is located in the Altos Sur Region. The municipality covers an area of 182.09 square miles (471.62 km2).

It has always been a small town, which firstly was called Cañadas ("Glens"). In 1929 his name was changed to Villa Obregón (Obregón Village), in honor to Mexican president Álvaro Obregón (assassinated on July 17, 1928, in Mexico City). However, on January 10, 1980, it again changed its name, this time to Cañadas de Obregón, partially recovering its original name.

As of 2005, the municipality had a total population of 3,978.

The population of the municipality has decreased due to emigration, generally to the United States. Their main sources of economic income are agriculture and remittances sent by their fellow citizens residing in the United States.

History 
Before the Spanish conquest of the Aztec Empire, this region was included within the dominion of Coinan and its inhabitants were from the Nahuas tribes. The conquest was carried out by Pedro Almíndez Chirino at the beginning of 1530, sent by Nuño de Guzmán. Chirinos arrived at the place destroying and setting fire to everything in his path. After him, Cristóbal de Oñate arrived, and observed a behavior opposite to that of the first, getting the provinces to present obedience to the Spanish Crown.

By decree number 1016 of October 1, 1903, it became a municipality, and by decree number 3577 of March 2, 1929, its name was changed to Villa Obregón in memory of revolutionary leader Álvaro Obregón. Since 1825, it belonged to the Third Canton of La Barca, and since 1872, to the 11th Canton of Teocaltiche. As of that date, it included the commissaryships of Cañadas, Valle de Guadalupe, Catachimé, Los Yugos, Rancho de Abajo, Laguna de Santa Gertrudis, and El Ejido.

Geography

Location 
Cañadas de Obregón is located in the northeast of Jalisco, between coordinates 21º06'40" and 21º13'30" North latitude, and 102º33'40" and 102º45'00" West longitude; at a height of 6,070 feet above sea level (1,850 meters above sea level).

The municipality borders to the North with the municipalities of Mexticacán and Jalostotitlán; to the East with the municipalities of Jalostotitlán and Valle de Guadalupe; to the South with the municipalities of Valle de Guadalupe and Yahualica de González Gallo; to the West with the municipalities of Yahualica de González Gallo and Mexticacán.

Topography 
Most of its surface is made up of semi-flat areas (61%), flat areas (34%); the remaining areas (5%) are hilly.

Soil 
The territory is made up of lands that belong to the Quaternary period. The composition of the soils is predominantly haplic feozem, chromic luvisol and eutric regosol. The municipality has a land area of 116,536 acres (47,162 hectares), of which 20,608 acres (8,340 hectares) are used for agricultural purposes, 80,608 (32,622) for livestock activities, 5,436 (2,200) are for forestry use, 304 (123) are urban land, and 5201 (2,105) have other uses; the use of the remainder 4,379 (1,772), was not specified. As far as property is concerned, an area of 108,117 (43,755) is private, and another of 4,040 (1,635) is ejidal land; there is no communal property.

Hydrography 
The municipality of Cañadas de Obregón belongs to the Lerma-Chapala-Santiago hydrological basin, and also to the Rio Verde-Grande de Belén sub-basin. Its hydrological resources are provided by the following rivers: Verde, La Laja, Jalostotitlán, and San Miguel. There are some brooks: El Salto, La Paleta, El Saltillo, and Salitre. It has hot springs in Temacapulín.

Climate 
The climate is semi-dry, with dry Autumn, Winter and Spring, and warm, with no well-defined winter thermal change. The rainfall regime lasts during June and July, with an average rainfall of 55.2 millimeters. The annual average of days with frost is 16.5. The prevailing winds are in the direction of the Southwest.

Flora and fauna 
Its flora is mainly composed of oak, nopal, huisache, palo dulce, and grassland. Its fauna is made up of rabbits, hares, opossums, deer, and other minor species.

Economy 

45.82% of the inhabitants is dedicated to the primary sector, 25.33% to secondary sector, 26.74% to tertiary sector, and the rest is not specified. 29.02% is economically active. The main economic activities are: agriculture, fishing, livestock, commerce and industry.

 Agriculture: corn, beans and chile are grown.
 Livestock: cattle, pigs, and sheep are raised.
 Tourism: it has architectural and natural attractions.
 Commerce: has restaurants, markets and shops. The sale of basic necessities and mixed shops that sell various items predominate.
 Services: technical, communal, personal and maintenance services are provided.
 Fishing: catfish and carp are fished.
 Fish farming: tilapia, catfish, carp, and frog farms.
 Industry: manufacturing and handicraft industries stand out.

Infrastructure 
 Education
87.07% of the population is literate, of which 32.20% has completed elementary education. The municipality has three preschool schools, 14 primary, 2 secondaries and one preparatory.

 Health
Health care is taken care of by the State Secretary of Health and private doctors. The System for the Integral Development of the Family (Desarrollo Integral de la Familia, DIF) is in charge of social welfare.

 Sports
It has sports centers, where are played: soccer, basketball, international fronton, baseball, athletics, and volleyball. It also has a cultural center, a plaza, a cinema, parks, a 1680 bullring, gardens and a library.

 Housing
It has 1,130 homes, which are generally private. 92.21% have electricity service, 73.01% have drainage and drinking water service. Its construction is generally based on brick, adobe, and concrete.

 Services
The municipality has drinking water, sewerage, public lighting, markets, flea markets, cemeteries, public cleaning, public safety, parks, gardens and sports centers.

86.9% of the inhabitants have potable water; 72.4% sewerage, and 95.1% electrical energy.

 Media and communication channels
It has mail service, telegraph, telephone, radiotelephony service. Transportation is carried out through the Guadalajara-San Luis Potosí highway. It has a network of rural roads that connect the localities; transportation is done in public buses, taxis, and family cars.

Demographics 
According to the 2010 Population and Housing Census, the municipality has 4,152 inhabitants, of which 2,015 are men and 2,137 are women; 0.65% of the population is indigenous.

Religion 
99.08% profess the catholic religion, there are also believers of Jehovah's Witnesses, protestants and rastafarians. 0.51% of the inhabitants claimed not to practice any religion.

Localities 
The municipality has a total of 34 localities, of which the main ones and the population they have are the following:

Culture 

 Crafts: embroidered articles, pottery, and furniture.
 Typical costumes: charro costume.
 Gastronomy: pozole, jocoque and fish cooked on stalks of maguey stand out; of their drinks, tequila and mezcal.

Sites of interest

Feasts 
 Candlemas: from January 24 to February 5.
 Virgin of the Light: from May 16 to 18.
 Popular festivals: January 23.
 Feast of Our Lady of Guadalupe, from December 4 to 12.
 National holidays, September 15 and 16.
 Day of the Dead, November 2.
 Festivities in honor of the Christ of Goodness (Summer Festival) from the last Sunday in July to the first Sunday in August.

Notable people 
 José Leopoldo González González, first bishop of the Diocese of Nogales, Sonora.

Government 
The form of government is democratic and depends on Jalisco state government, and federal government. Elections are held every three years, when the municipal president and her/his council are elected.

Municipal presidents

References

Municipalities of Jalisco